2α-(Propanoyl)-3β-(2-(6-methoxynaphthyl))-tropane or WF-33 is a cocaine analogue. It, along with WF-23 the other "2-naphthyl" cocaine analogue, are considered the more potent of the WF series cocaine analogues.

See also
 List of cocaine analogues

References

Tropanes
Dopamine reuptake inhibitors
Stimulants
Naphthol ethers
Phenol ethers